Foucaucourt-en-Santerre is a commune in the Somme department in Hauts-de-France in northern France.

Geography

Population

World War I
During World War I the village hosted a temporary aerodrome to the west of the village opposite the cemetery. It was first held by the Germans, and fell into allied hands by the end of the war. The German Jagdstaffel 34 was stationed here from April to July 1918, and RAF 208 Squadron moved in on 22 September 1918.

Places of interest
 The war memorial
 The Roman road, the ‘Chaussée Brunehaut’, which passes by the village.

See also
Communes of the Somme department

References

Communes of Somme (department)